"Holy" is a song by Canadian singer Justin Bieber, featuring vocals from American rapper Chance the Rapper. It was released on September 18, 2020, as the lead single off Bieber's sixth studio album, Justice (2021). "Holy" is a pop song with elements of gospel. Billboard named it the 41st best song of 2020. The acoustic version was released on November 6, 2020. The official music video for the song was released on September 18, 2020, and features Bieber as a laid-off oil worker and his partner being helped by a charitable soldier.

Background
Bieber's fifth studio album Changes was released on February 14, 2020. On September 15, 2020, Bieber tweeted that his new single "Holy" would be released in a few days to signify his next musical "era". It has been speculated that the song is about Bieber's love for his wife Hailey Bieber and his love of God. "Holy" discusses themes of loyalty and faith, with The New York Times calling it "devotional R&B".

Bieber and Chance had previously worked on several songs together, with "Holy" marking their fifth collaboration. In terms of the lyrical content, both Bieber and Chance are Christians as well as songwriter Jon Bellion.

Jon Bellion earlier performed it at a VIP concert event saying that it will be released later in the year. Bellion's fans would begin to beg for it and eventually get it released by Bieber and Chance The Rapper, whom Jon would work with knowing they would reach a broader audience and more ears overall.

Composition
"Holy" is a R&B, Piano pop, Trap song, with Gospel elements. The song composed in G-flat major with a tempo of 88 beats per minute.

Release and promotion
Bieber performed a live version of the song on Saturday Night Live on October 17, 2020. He performed the song again at the 2020 People's Choice Awards in November.

The acoustic version of the song was released on November 6.

A charity version of the song was released on December 18. This version featured the Lewisham and Greenwich NHS Choir, who had got to the top of the UK Christmas singles chart in 2015 with their charity release "A Bridge over You", a chart which saw Bieber at number two with "Love Yourself". "Holy" was an early contender for the 2020 UK Christmas number one in the UK. However, when the new version was released on 18 December 2020, it still had a credit for Chance the Rapper, like the original version which first entered the UK chart on 25 September 2020. As the new record was seen as just a remix, "Holy" ended up at Number 41 in the Christmas chart with 17,594 sales, after being classed as per the original release with a lower chart ratio.

Critical reception
NME rated the song 3/5 stars, and drew similarities to Kanye West's gospel music. Stereogum criticized the song's bland lyrics and execution, writing, "Being madly in love with your spouse is good; it’s just that the Justin Bieber songs about being madly in love with your spouse are bad."

Year-end lists

Commercial performance
"Holy" debuted and peaked at number one on the Canadian Hot 100 issued for October 3, 2020. It was certified 2× Platinum by Music Canada. On the US Billboard Hot 100, it debuted and peaked at number three. It earned a 3× Platinum certification from the Recording Industry Association of America (RIAA), which denotes three million units based on sales and track-equivalent on-demand streams. "Holy" reached number seven on the UK Singles Chart, and the British Phonographic Industry (BPI) certified it Gold. In Australia, the song charted at number four and went 2× Platinum. It peaked at number two in New Zealand and received a Platinum certification. "Holy" reached the top 10 of national record charts, at number two in Ireland, number three in the Netherlands, Norway, number five in Singapore, Sweden, number six in the Czech Republic, Malaysia, number seven in Denmark, number eight in Poland, number nine in Scotland, and number 10 in Austria, Hungary, Switzerland. The song received a Gold certification in Belgium, Norway.

Music video
The music video for "Holy" was released the same day as the song, September 18, 2020. It was directed by Colin Tilley and stars Wilmer Valderrama and Ryan Destiny. The video follows Bieber, a recently laid off oil worker, and Destiny as a couple who meet a helpful soldier played by Valderrama. The video has been interpreted as a commentary on the Just Transition. As of December 18, 2021, the official music video has surpassed over 186 million views.

Credits and personnel
Credits adapted from Jaxsta.

 Justin Bieber – lead vocals, songwriting
 Chance the Rapper – featured artist, lead vocals, songwriting
 Jon Bellion – production, songwriting, background vocals, percussion
 Jorgen Odegard – production, songwriting, background vocals, drums, engineering, programming, synthesizer
 Michael Pollack – production, songwriting, background vocals, piano
 Steven Franks – production, songwriting
 Tommy Lee Brown – production, songwriting, bass
 Anthony M. Jones – songwriting
 Elijah Marrett-Hitch – assistant mixing
 Darian Elliot – background vocals
 Melodie Pace – background vocals
 Michael Bethany – background vocals
 Kirk Franklin – choir arranging
 Scooter Braun – choir arranging
 Chris O'Ryan – engineering
 Devin Nakao – engineering
 John Arbuckle – engineering
 Josh Gudwin – engineering, mix engineering
 Colin Leonard – mastering engineering
 Michael Havens – recording engineering
 Candice Mills – vocals
 Carla Williams – vocals
 Christeyun Morgan – vocals
 Demarcus Williams – vocals
 Denae Daugherty – vocals
 Drea Randle Matthews – vocals
 Eboni Ellerson – vocals
 Eric Birdine – vocals
 James McKissic – vocals
 Ja'Quoi Griffin – vocals
 Mariann Shaw – vocals
 Marshari Williams – vocals
 Myron Williams – vocals
 Tameka Sanford – vocals
 Zahrea Clayton – vocals

Charts

Weekly charts

Year-end charts

Certifications

Release history

References

2020 singles
2020 songs
Canadian Hot 100 number-one singles
Chance the Rapper songs
Justin Bieber songs
Def Jam Recordings singles
Music videos directed by Colin Tilley
Songs written by Chance the Rapper
Songs written by Jon Bellion
Songs written by Justin Bieber
Songs written by Michael Pollack (musician)
Songs written by Tommy Brown (record producer)
Song recordings produced by Tommy Brown (record producer)
Contemporary Christian songs
Songs written by Anthony M. Jones
Song recordings produced by Jon Bellion